Israel E. Pike (also known as Jacob Pike and Jay Pike; December, 1853 – February 10, 1925) was an outfielder who played in Major League Baseball during the 1877 season.

Baseball career
Pike batted and threw left-handed. He was Jewish. His brother, Lipman Emanuel Pike, had much more renown and is a member of the International Jewish Sports Hall of Fame.

Pike's major league career, statistically speaking, was only slightly different than that of Red Bluhm, Eddie Gaedel, or Moonlight Graham. On August 27, 1877, he appeared in one game for the Brooklyn Hartfords of the National League. Pike connected one hit in four at bats in his only game for a .250 batting average, but he made an error in the outfield. 
 
Pike also played the outfield for the Lowell, Massachusetts team that won the 1875 state championship and claimed the New England title. That same year, he also served as an umpire in the National Association.

References

External links
Baseball Reference stats
Futility Infielder
Jews in Sports

1853 births
1925 deaths
19th-century baseball players
Baseball players from New York (state)
Hartford Dark Blues players
Jewish American baseball players
Jewish Major League Baseball players
Major League Baseball right fielders
Place of birth missing